Hibbertia fasciculiflora is a species of flowering plant in the family Dilleniaceae and is endemic to the south-west of Western Australia. It is an erect to spreading shrub with linear to narrow oblong leaves arranged in dense bunches near the ends of branchlets, and yellow flowers borne among the leaf bundles with eight to ten stamens all on one side of the two carpels.

Description
There are eight to ten stamens all on one side of the two carpels with one or two staminodes either side of the stamens. The carpels are densely hairy and there are two ovules per carpel. Flowering has been recorded in September.

Taxonomy
Hibbertia fasciculiflora was first formally described in 2017 by Kevin Thiele in the journal Nuytsia from specimens he collected in Tathra National Park in 2008. The specific epithet (fasciculiflora) means "fascicle-flower" referring to the flowers borne among the leaf bundles.

Distribution and habitat
This species grows in low, open woodland and kwongan, mostly in the Tathra and Alexander Morrison National Parks in the Geraldton Sandplains biogeographic region in the south-west of Western Australia.

Conservation status
Hibbertia fasciculiflora is classified as "not threatened" by the Government of Western Australia Department of Parks and Wildlife.

See also
List of Hibbertia species

References

fasciculiflora
Flora of Western Australia
Plants described in 2009
Taxa named by Kevin Thiele